Hugh Clegg may refer to:

Hugh Clegg (academic) (1920–1995), British academic
Hugh Clegg (physician) (1900–1983), British medical doctor

See also
 Hugh Cleghorn (disambiguation)